William Vorilong, also known as Guillermus Vorrilong, Willem of Verolon, William of Vaurouillon, Guilelmus de Valle Rouillonis, etc. (ca. 1390 - 1463) was a French philosopher and theologian. He wrote a biography of Duns Scotus. From 1457 onwards he was a regent master in Lyon, becoming licentiate and master of theology at Lyon in 1458.

Notes

External links
 William Vorilong at The Logic Museum

1390s births
1463 deaths
French logicians
15th-century French philosophers
French male non-fiction writers